= Economic Outlook =

- Discipline: Economics
- Language: English

Publication details
- History: 1977–present
- Publisher: Wiley-Blackwell on behalf of Oxford Economics
- Frequency: Quarterly

Standard abbreviations
- ISO 4: Econ. Outlook

Indexing
- ISSN: 0140-489X (print); 1468-0319 (web)

Links
- Journal homepage; Online access

Economic Outlook is a quarterly academic journal published by Wiley-Blackwell on behalf of Oxford Economics. The journal was established in 1977. Economic Outlook is a report detailing the forecast over the next five years for all United Kingdom macroeconomic indicators. The journal analyzes UK sectors such as fiscal policy, the housing market, monetary policy, prices and wages, the labor market, economic activity and consumer demand, among other sectors. Economic Outlook also features regular Feature Articles as well as a general economic assessment and overview of the United States, European and Japanese economies.
